Alpbach is a town in western Austria in the state of Tyrol.

History
The earliest written record of the name Alpbach comes from 1150, although human settlement is known to have begun there before and around the year 1000, and a bronze axe found at Steinberger Joch (the pass leading to the Ziller Valley) in 1860 suggests that the route was already in use in the Hallstatt period.

Christianity was first brought to the region in the 7th and 8th centuries by Irish and Scottish monks, and the patron saint of the parish church is in fact St. Oswald, a former King of Northumbria.

At the beginning of the 15th century, deposits of copper and silver were discovered on the Gratlspitz and Schatzberg and in the Luegergraben. At the time, the Fugger merchant family from Augsburg had control over mining operations in Schwaz and Kitzbühel, and they extended their activities to include the Alpbach valley. The Böglerhof housed the Fugger offices and was also seat of the Mining Court. In those days, Alpbach already had two inns, the Böglerhof and the Jakober Inn, where the men of the village would go to drink spirits, such as schnapps. By the middle of the 19th century, productivity at the mines had declined to the stage where they had to be closed.

Vorder-Unterberg Farm, which was built in 1636–1638 by local carpenters and was lived in until 1952, stands at the edge of the forest above the little church in Inneralpbach. Today the building is a mountain farming museum, and the exhibits include the old parlour, chapel, a combined kitchen and smokehouse, and over 800 artefacts of daily life and work.

The road leading up the valley to Alpbach was not built until 1926, and the isolated location of the village led to the development of a distinctive style of architecture and furnishings, and also enabled the local folk traditions to be preserved for much longer than in most of the valleys of the Tyrol.

Era of tourism
Tourists first began arriving in Alpbach at the beginning of the 20th century and by 1938 the village had accommodation for 110 visitors. Since then this figure has increased to 2500 and Alpbach now attracts some 22,000 visitors in summer and about the same in winter for an annual total of 300,000 nights. Tourism is the main source of income for today's 2300 local residents, but there are still 105 working farms in Alpbach, the same number as a hundred years ago.

Since 1945, Alpbach has been the venue for the Alpbach European Forum, an annual two-week conference of leading figures from the worlds of science, business, the arts and politics. The Forum and the participation of so many people who have shaped the thinking of their times has given Alpbach the nickname, "The Village Of Thinkers."

The first conference hall in Alpbach was built in the mid-1950s and named after the Austrian poet Paula von Preradovic, who wrote the words for the Austrian national anthem. The plenary hall was named after the physicist and Nobel Prize winner Erwin Schrödinger. He lies buried in the Alpbach cemetery.

At the suggestion of Alfons Moser, Mayor of Alpbach from 1945 to 1979, the Council issued a local planning law in 1953, which made the traditional style of architecture in Alpbach mandatory for all new buildings.

Over the years, Alpbach has collected many awards and distinctions. In 1975, the Austrian Public Health Institute certified that Alpbach had the cleanest and purest air in all of Austria. It was voted "Austria's Most Beautiful Village" in 1983 by a television contest organised by Austrian Television. In June 1985, the Council of Europe in Strasbourg conferred upon Alpbach the right to fly the European flag in recognition of the community's services to European Unity. In 1993, Alpbach won "The Most Beautiful Floral Village in Europe" award.

Modern Alpbach
In 1999, the new Alpbach Congress Centre was opened, together with the 55th European Forum. With its combination of exciting architecture and a minimum environmental footprint, the main architectural feature is a spiral shaped gallery with floor-to-ceiling glazing for a unique view of the spectacular mountain backdrop.

Alpbach is also a well known ski resort and its quiet pistes are well groomed and provide beginner to intermediate runs with many off pistes as well as unpatrolled route 5 which is popular with the more advanced skiers. A new lift has been opened in 2006-2007 which is a gondola and allows people to move from Inner-Alpbach to near the top of the Wiedersberger Horn (the mountain used for all of the runs). Alpbach is also more popular with skiers than snowboarders due to the lack of extreme off piste, but is a very popular place for beginner boarders, or those looking to re-kindle their boarding passion. There is also a halfpipe for the more adventurous. There are three ski schools in the village, the first is the original  Ski and Snowboardschool at Alpbach-Inneralpbach run since 1932 by Sepp Margreiter (a state-certified ski instructor and ski guide). The second is the Alpbach Active Skischule, of which the HQ of the ski school run from Alpbach, the same as the original ski school. The third is Schischule Alpbachtal, or SkiCheck. This is the most recently established ski school in the valley, founded in 2012.

References

External links

 http://www.alpbach.at
 https://web.archive.org/web/20080118173640/http://www.alpbach-aktiv.com/web/index.html

Cities and towns in Kufstein District